Southend or Bradfield Southend is a small rural village in the west of the civil parish of Bradfield in the English county of Berkshire. Until the 1965 opening of its church it was a hamlet.  In the 2011 census it had 738 residents, forming 33.9% of the civil parish's recorded population.

Church
St Peter's Church in Southend, Bradfield is in a shared Church of England parish with Bradfield. Opened in 1965, the church seats 100.

Transport
Buses 41 to and from Thatcham stop several times a day in the village.

Governance
Administratively it is in West Berkshire, below which the civil parish council is responsible for minor recreational and events amenities, as well as being a statutory force and consultee in the town and country planning local plans and for all applications submitted within its area.

After each Periodic review since its 1885 creation, Southend has consistently been in the Newbury Westminster constituency.

Demography
Excluding outlying farms and cottages of Bradfield, Southend, often shown on maps as Bradfield Southend, comprised two Output Areas of the 2011 census. The number of households who had no car or van was 5.7% divided as follows:

Notable residents
Sisters Kate and Pippa Middleton lived here with their family throughout the 1980s.

Citations and footnotes

External links

Villages in Berkshire
Bradfield, Berkshire